The 1996–97 Michigan Wolverines men's basketball team represented the University of Michigan in intercollegiate college basketball during the 1996–97 season. The team played its home games in the Crisler Arena in Ann Arbor, Michigan, and was a member of the Big Ten Conference.  Under the direction of head coach Steve Fisher, the team finished tied for sixth in the Big Ten Conference. The team earned an invitation to the 1997 National Invitation Tournament where it emerged as champion. The team was ranked for sixteen of the eighteen weeks of Associated Press Top Twenty-Five Poll, starting the season ranked ninth, peaking at number fourth and ending unranked, and it also ended the season unranked in the final USA Today/CNN Poll. The team had a 3–4 record against ranked opponents, including the following victories: December 8, 1996, against #10 Duke 62–61 on the road, December 21, 1996, against #6 Arizona 73–71 in overtime at the Palace of Auburn Hills, and on January 9, 1997, against #25 Illinois 88–74 at home.

Robert Traylor and Travis Conlan served as team co-captains, while Robert Traylor and Louis Bullock shared team MVP honors. The team's leading scorers were Louis Bullock (569 points), Robert Traylor  (460 points), and Maurice Taylor (433 points). The leading rebounders were Robert Traylor (271), Maceo Baston (231), and Maurice Taylor (218).

Bullock led the Big Ten Conference in three-point field goals made in all games (101) and free throw percentage in conference games (89.3%). The team led the Big Ten in scoring average with a 73.3 average in conference games.

Bullock set school records for single-season three-point field goals (101) made and single-season free throw percentage (84.48), surpassing Glen Rice (99, 1989) and Cazzie Russell (84.27, 1964), respectively. Both marks continue to be school bests but carry an asterisk due to Bullock's participation in the University of Michigan basketball scandal. Bullock would surpass his free throw percentage mark two years later. The team set a new school record for single-season three-point shots made (203), which they would rebreak the following season. This surpassed the 196 total set in 1989.

Regular season

National Invitation Tournament
West
Michigan 76, Miami 63
Second Round
Michigan 75, Oklahoma State 65
Quarterfinal
Michigan 67, Notre Dame 66
Semifinal
Michigan 77, Arkansas 62
Final
Michigan 82, Florida State 73

Statistics
The team posted the following statistics:

 * Denotes players whose individual records, awards and other honors have been vacated due to NCAA and U-M sanctions

Rankings

Awards and honors

Team players drafted into the NBA
Four players from this team were selected in the NBA Draft.

See also
1997 National Invitation Tournament
List of vacated and forfeited games in college basketball
University of Michigan basketball scandal

References

Michigan Wolverines men's basketball seasons
Michigan
National Invitation Tournament championship seasons
Michigan
Michigan
Michigan